Flavobacterium branchiarum  is a bacterium from the genus of Flavobacterium which can cause bacterial gill disease in rainbow trouts.

References

External links
Type strain of Flavobacterium branchiarum at BacDive -  the Bacterial Diversity Metadatabase

 

branchiarum
Bacteria described in 2016